Janolus capensis, the Cape silvertip nudibranch, is a beautiful species of nudibranch, or sea slug. It is a marine gastropod mollusc in the family Proctonotidae.

Apart from striking differences in the egg ribbons, individuals of this species are externally not distinguishable from the medallion silvertip nudibranch.

Distribution
This species is endemic to the South African coast and is found only from Saldanha Bay to East London, from the intertidal border to at least 40 m.

Description
The Cape silvertip nudibranch grows up to 40 mm in total length. It is a pale-bodied nudibranch with dark- to tan-coloured cerata with white tips. Its rhinophores are white and rolled. They are separated from one another by an opaque white spherical mass of unknown function known as the rhinophoral crest.

Ecology
This species of nudibranch feeds on moss animals, bryozoans such as Menipea triseriata and Onchoporella buskii. The egg mass is globular, convoluted and has numerous eggs per capsule. The egg ribbon of the medallion silvertip is diagnostic for the species: a flat spiral of capsules with only 5-7 eggs per capsule.

References

External links
 http://www.seaslugforum.net/factsheet/janocape

Proctonotidae
Gastropods described in 1907